"Leaving on a Jet Plane" is a song written and recorded by singer-songwriter John Denver in 1966, originally included on his debut demo recording John Denver Sings as "Babe I Hate To Go". He made several copies and gave them out as presents for Christmas of that year. Denver's then producer Milt Okun convinced him to change the title and was renamed "Leaving on a Jet Plane" in 1967.

In 1969, simultaneous to the success of the Peter, Paul and Mary version, Denver recorded the song again for his debut studio album, Rhymes & Reasons, and it was released as a single in October 1969 through RCA Records. Although it is one of John Denver's best known songs, his single failed to enter the charts.

"Leaving on a Jet Plane" was re-recorded for the third and final time in 1973 for John Denver's Greatest Hits, the version that also appears on most of his compilation albums.

Background 
John Denver, then a relatively unknown musician in the Los Angeles folk scene of 23 years old, had written the song during a layover at Washington Airport in 1966.

In one of BBC Radio specials, Denver said about the song:

Though not written about the Vietnam War, the Peter, Paul and Mary cover of the song was interpreted by at least one writer to be a protest song about a soldier leaving his partner, unsure if he would return.

Certifications

Peter, Paul and Mary version 

The most well known  version was recorded by American folk group Peter, Paul and Mary, for their 1967 studio album, Album 1700, and Warner Bros.- Seven Arts released it as a single in 1969 after being one of four songs on a promo EP in 1967. John Denver was a close friend of theirs and they shared the same producer in that time, Milt Okun.

It was Peter, Paul and Mary's biggest (and final) hit, becoming their only No. 1 on the Billboard Hot 100 chart in the United States. The song also spent three weeks atop the easy listening chart  and was used in commercials for United Airlines in the late 1960s and early 1970s. The song also topped the charts in Canada, and reached No. 2 in both the UK Singles Chart and Irish Singles Chart in February 1970. In fact, it was the only version of the song that charted.

Cash Box described this version as "stunning material" with "an especially fine arrangement".

Weekly charts

Year-end charts

All-time charts

Lawsuit
In the 1980s, the song prompted litigation involving the British group New Order. The band's single "Run 2" (1989) was the subject of a lawsuit brought by Denver, who argued that its wordless guitar break was based on his "Leaving on a Jet Plane". The case was settled out of court, and Denver subsequently received a co-writer credit for the song.

References

External links
 
 
 Leaving On A Jet Plane at 45cat.com

1966 songs
1969 singles
John Denver songs
Peter, Paul and Mary songs
Songs written by John Denver
Song recordings produced by Milt Okun
Billboard Hot 100 number-one singles
Cashbox number-one singles
RPM Top Singles number-one singles
RCA Records singles
Warner Records singles
Songs about parting